Christopher Paul Backus (born October 30, 1981) is an American actor, director and screenwriter. Backus made his television debut in NBC's Will & Grace, followed by landing roles in The O.C., Life on Mars, It's Always Sunny in Philadelphia, Sons of Anarchy, The Mentalist, Perception, and The Last Templar. He also appeared in films such as Redline starring Eddie Griffin and 3 Days Gone directed by Scott McCullough.

Early life and education 
Backus was born in Mission Viejo, California, but was raised in Kansas City, Kansas. His mother, Teryl Backus, is a retired colonel in the United States Marine Corps, and his father, Terry Backus, was a lawyer who died when Christopher was a child. He has one sister, Michele.

Career
Backus moved with friend Rob McElhenney from New York City to Los Angeles during pilot season of 2003. Shortly after arriving, Backus landed his first role in Benjamin Splits, while McElhenney developed the sitcom It's Always Sunny in Philadelphia. After landing supporting roles in NBC's hit show Will & Grace and Fox's The O.C., Backus starred opposite Dominique Swain in Nick Vallelonga's All In. He returned to television in Malik Bader's HUGE in which he portrayed a struggling frontman of an indie rock band. He starred in 3 Days Gone along with Patrick J. Adams, Nothing Personal with Paz de la Huerta, and Elevator with John Getz and Anita Briem.

Backus returned to television to play the leader of the Weather Underground in ABC's period drama Life on Mars, then he reteamed with director Nick Vallelonga on a western with Michael Biehn and James Russo, Yellow Rock.

In 2011, the feature film Union Square, co-written and directed by the Sundance Film Festival's Grand Jury Award Winner, Nancy Savoca, was premiered at the Toronto Film Festival. In it, Backus appears alongside Mira Sorvino, Patti Lupone, Tammy Blanchard, Mike Doyle, and Michael Rispoli.

In summer 2011, Backus appeared as Marlene Dietrich in My Fair Lidy.

Most recently he starred as Marcus in Among Friends, directed by "scream queen" Danielle Harris.

Backus was set to direct a thriller titled The Sessionist, but dropped out of the project due to creative differences.

Personal life 
Backus met Mira Sorvino at a friend's charades party in August 2003. On June 11, 2004, they married in a private civil ceremony at the Santa Barbara, California, courthouse, then later had a hilltop ceremony in Capri, Italy. The couple have four children.

Filmography

Film

Television

References

External links
 

1981 births
Living people
21st-century American male actors
American male screenwriters
American male television actors
American male film actors
People from Mission Viejo, California
Male actors from Kansas City, Kansas
Male actors from Orange County, California
Screenwriters from Kansas
Screenwriters from California